Xenotilapia boulengeri is a species of cichlid endemic to Lake Tanganyika where it occurs in schools in areas with sandy substrates.  Its diet consists of small shrimps and copepods.  This species can reach a length of  TL.  It can also be found in the aquarium trade. The specific name honours the Belgian-British zoologist George Albert Boulenger (1858-1937), in recognition of his world on the fishes of Lake Tanganyika.

References

External links
 Photograph

boulengeri
Fish described in 1942
Taxonomy articles created by Polbot